Jude Brewer is an American writer, producer, actor, and podcast host, best known for creating and hosting Storybound and Storytellers Telling Stories. Brewer's writing has appeared internationally through literary magazines, and most recently in podcasts and short films.

Career

Writing & Film
Tania Hershman, author, and judge of the 2017 UK Retreat West Flash Fiction Prize, has described Brewer's writing as "[taking] risks in its structure, going off on tangents, not following a linear narrative, and the risks pay off. It is dark and funny and moving and strange. There is not a word too many or too few, and every word is precisely chosen, the character’s voice never strays… I could read this again and again and again."

Two of Brewer's short literary fiction pieces were adapted for his podcast Storytellers Telling Stories with Brewer narrating. Season 4 of Storybound brought Brewer's voice acting to the forefront for multiple character voices across several episodes.

During a 2021 Film Invasion Los Angeles (FILA) Q&A session with Brewer and director Jake Whiston for their film Your Heart Is Mine, FILA programmer Jeff Howard said, "As the lead, Brewer carried this film beautifully". Brewer won "Best Actor" at the Oregon Scream Week Horror film festival, while Your Heart Is Mine won "Best Dark Drama Film" and received the Programmer's Prize at the Sherman Oaks Film Festival, as well as making Official Selection for the Seattle True Independent Film Festival, the Oregon Short Film Festival, the Short Sweet Film Fest, and the Austin After Dark Film Festival.

Podcasting & Interviewing
Around early 2017, Brewer launched John Plays the Piano, a roundtable film discussion podcast, breaking down and analyzing classic films such as Brazil, Being John Malkovich, and Small Soldiers. Eight episodes were released. Brewer has said John Plays the Piano is on an "indefinite hiatus". In October 2017, Brewer launched the Storytellers Telling Stories podcast as a means to take a break from writing, craving something "more experimental and a little less predictable", toying with different instruments while warping and distorting their sounds. The show has been described as an audio drama "pushing the evolution" of podcasting. The initial concept was to simulate a movie within the listener's mind, to create a sense of total immersion without requiring any visuals. Lights Out has been cited as an influence for Brewer, as was listening to concept albums and following their track listings to outline his stories and novels as a teenager. Storytellers Telling Stories wrapped with its series finale in August 2019, bringing together 27 different writers reading the work of author Traci Foust, as Foust had passed away the previous year.

In October 2019, Lit Hub announced a partnership with The Podglomerate, launching the Storybound, a new podcast created, produced, and hosted by Brewer. Lit Hub announced the show would explore "family life to friendship, relationships to histories, and how everything in life can be impacted by the power of a good story". Season one was sponsored by Powell's Books, including musicians who originally appeared on Storytellers Telling Stories, alongside critically acclaimed and bestselling authors such as Mitch Albom, Lidia Yuknavitch, Matt Gallagher, Kim Barnes, Adelle Waldman, Diksha Basu, Nathan Hill, Caitlin Doughty, Mitchell S. Jackson, as well as a story told by Jack Rhysider, creator of the popular podcast Darknet Diaries.

Season 3 incorporated more experimental cross-genre music compositions with sampling created and arranged by Brewer. Storybound's musical shift followed Brewer wanting "to take on more of a defined shape as [Storybound began] understanding [its] place within the dramatic podcast community", and he began sampling breakout artists like Josh Garrels, MAITA, Xander Marsden, Anna Tivel, Oginalii, Marco Pavé, Gil Assayas of GLASYS, Y La Bamba, and other Tender Loving Empire artists like French Cassettes. Storybound season 4 continued to expand and build upon the show's experimental shift, crediting Brewer for "original Storybound remixes" as well as sound design and arrangement. Along with authors such as Chuck Klosterman, Morgan Jerkins, Omar El Akkad, Matt Haig, and Tamara Winfrey Harris. Season 4 features more prominent musicians such as Portico Quartet, Dustin O'Halloran, Jaymay, Au Revoir Simone, Fake Shark, Zola Jesus, The Bright Light Social Hour, and Shook Twins. Season 5 was announced for 2022, bringing on Debbie Millman, Dante Stewart, Stephanie Foo, Tommy Davidson, Dan Chaon, Imogen Binnie, Daniel Olivas and more. Season 5 marked a tonal change for the show, cutting between interviews and author readings, blending styles from previous seasons.

In 2021, Brewer was awarded 1st place in the KCRW Radio Race with the following statement:

Judges Julie Shapiro, Nick Quah, Sean Rameswaram, and The Kitchen Sisters praised BUZZY for "its overall ear-catching production, its unusual narration and style of delivery, its fine and original sound design and the heart of the story".

Awards
 2021 First Place, BUZZY, KCRW's Radio Race
 2020 Best Actor, Your Heart Is Mine, Oregon Scream Week Horror Film Festival
 2018 Runner-up, Gertrude Press Chapbook Contest
 2017 Winner, UK Retreat West Flash Fiction Prize
 2017 Winner, New Millennium Writings Muse October Prize
 2017 Finalist, Montana Book Festival

Bibliography

Audio Adaptations
 BUZZY - KCRW's Radio Race (2021) & Storybound, Season 4 (2021)
 Say What You Will - Storytellers Telling Stories, Season 2, Episode 10 (2019)
 We Didn't Know What Was Happening - Storytellers Telling Stories, Season 1, Episode 21 (2018)

Film
 Your Heart is Mine (2020)

Short fiction
 "Say What You Will" - Stephen O'Donnell's The Untold Gaze (2018)
 "Thank You" - Typishly Magazine (2017)
 "Job #18 Divinity" - The Clackamas Literary Review, 20th Anniversary Issue (2017)
 "While My Wife Is Out Of Town" - Retreat West's Impermanent Facts (2017)
 "The Has Been, The Dancer, The Invader" - Scintilla Press Magazine, Issue 10 (2016)

References

External links

Living people
1989 births
Writers from California
Writers from Portland, Oregon
Screenwriters from Oregon
American podcasters
American male screenwriters
American male novelists
American male short story writers
Novelists from Oregon
Western Oregon University alumni